National Express is an intercity and Inter-regional coach operator providing services throughout Great Britain. It is a subsidiary of National Express Group. Most services are subcontracted to local coach companies. The company's head office is in offices above Birmingham Coach Station.

History

Pursuant to the Transport Act 1968, the National Bus Company was formed as a holding company for the many state-owned local bus companies. Many of these bus companies also operated coach services and these were initially branded as National. The National Express brand was first used in 1974 although the coach services continued to be operated by the individual companies.

Coach services were deregulated under the Transport Act 1980, and buses by the Transport Act 1985. In March 1988 National Express was privatised in a management buyout. In July 1989 the company bought ATL Holdings (with operations in Sheffield) and a 50% share in Yelloway Trathen, which was renamed Trathens Travel Services.

In August 1989 the Eurolines services from London to Alicante, Barcelona and Paris were purchased from Wallace Arnold, and the express services (with 29 coaches) in Scotland and to London from Stagecoach. These were operated under the Caledonian Express brand.

In June 1991 National Express was sold to the Drawlane Group. In December 1992 National Express Group plc was floated on the London Stock Exchange.

In its early years National Express had little competition in the long-distance coach market. A number of operators attempted to compete with the company after deregulation in 1980, the largest being the British Coachways consortium, but most had ceased to compete by the end of the decade. However, in 2003, Stagecoach introduced Megabus, a no-frills service whose £1 fares sparked a price war with National Express in autumn 2004. The competition intensified in 2007 when Megabus transferred its London terminus from the Green Line Coach Station into the main Victoria Coach Station.

In November 2007 National Express announced plans to re-brand all its operations under a new unified National Express identity. As part of this the coach operation received a slightly different livery, retaining the red, white and blue theme, but with a new lower-case logo. Coaches started appearing in the new livery from December 2007.

National network
A national network links more than 540 locations, including 59 of the UK mainland's 76 cities, with 1,800 plus services operating every day, increasing to over 1,900 on Fridays. Over 1,000 airport services a day run direct to the terminal for all major UK airports.

Operations

National Express offers many routes to destinations across the country. In addition, shuttle and airport services are also operated, although there is no obvious difference to the passenger between a standard, shuttle or airport service with regard to branding.

Many National Express coach routes pass through several town centres, which increases journey times for longer journeys considerably. A smaller number of shuttle services operate at least once an hour over faster direct routes.

National Express operates coach services direct to the terminal for all major UK airports, 24 hours a day, with 1,100 airport services every day, including East Midlands, Gatwick, Heathrow, Luton and Stansted. The Airport brand was created in 2003 when the National Express image brand was updated, merging the former Airlink, Flightlink, Jetlink and Speedlink brands. In the 2007 re-brand, the Airport branding was dropped, although the 'Airport' coding is still used on tickets.

Effects of the COVID-19 pandemic 
Following the introduction of guidance from the UK Government on avoiding non-essential travel, services were replaced from 24 March 2020 with a limited network of services for passengers with essential travel needs.  However, due to declining passenger numbers as a result of the restrictions, all services were suspended from 6 April 2020. Services restarted nearly three months later on 1 July, on about a quarter of route mileage and with reduced frequencies. The company gradually increased services on some routes but in October 2020 began to reduce the number of journeys again, following the implementation of new COVID-19 restrictions.

During the second national "lockdown" in November 2020, the company continued to run services albeit to a severely reduced timetable. After the ending of the month-long lockdown the company mainly restored the pre-lockdown timetable but with some alterations due to parts of the country being placed in different "tiers" of restrictions.

As a result of the discovery of a new, more transmissible variant and the implementation of tighter restrictions prohibiting travel in many areas of the country, services were significantly reduced by the end of December 2020. On the implementation of a third national lockdown in January 2021, services were again suspended from 11 January. Eleven weeks later, limited services again resumed on 29 March.

Franchised operators 
The majority of National Express services are contracted on long-term agreements to local coach companies, known as partner operators. As part of the contract, operators are required to use coaches in full National Express livery. On occasion, an operator will use its own branded vehicle due to lack of availability, but will be penalised financially for doing so. A wider list of additional operators are also available to bid for occasional work on the network – usually providing a one-off duplicate service to meet demand. Whilst still having to meet strict criteria, these coaches are usually not in National Express livery.

National Express operates some services itself, primarily those between Stansted, Heathrow and Luton airports, and Victoria Coach Station, London Liverpool Street and Woking.

Below is a list of partner operators:

 Ambassador Travel, Great Yarmouth
 Bennetts Coaches, Gloucester
 Bruce's Coaches, Salsburgh, North Lanarkshire
 Chalfont Coaches, Southall
 Edwards Coaches, Llantwit Fardre and Avonmouth
 East Yorkshire, Kingston upon Hull
 Galloway European, Mendlesham
 Go North East, Chester-Le-Street
 Kavanagh, Ireland
 Lucketts Travel, Fareham
 Llew Jones International, Llanrwst
 National Express West Midlands (Walsall Garage)
 Park's Motor Group, Hamilton
 Reading Buses, Reading
 Selwyns Travel, Runcorn
 Skills Coaches, Nottingham
 Stotts Coaches, Huddersfield
 Stagecoach Yorkshire, Barnsley
 The Kings Ferry, Deal
 Travelstar European, Walsall
 Yeomans Canyon Travel, Hereford

Fares
National Express tickets are available through a variety of sources. Most tickets are booked on-line through both the company’s own website and many third party sites, telephone bookings are also available as are tickets through the traditional channels tickets of National Express ticket offices at coach stations, third-party agents at bus stations and travel agents. Since 2013, tickets have also been available for purchase from the Post Office.

All fares are revenue managed with a range of prices, meaning that cheaper fares are generally available for those booking well in advance of travel. 

With the introduction of competition from Megabus, more competitive internet-only Funfares were introduced on some routes. These were phased out with the introduction of a full range of revenue managed fares from 2017.

There are several ticket types available, ranging from the cheapest restricted products, to a fully flexible product.

Coachcards
National Express offers several discounts to customers. 
Young Persons Coachcard – Available to people aged 16–26. This card gives a third off standard and fully flexible fares, plus 15% off events services.
Senior Coachcard – Following the Government's scrapping of the concessionary half-price fares for the over-60s in October 2011, National Express introduced a Senior Coachcard. Available to over-60s, this gives a third off standard and fully flexible fares.
Disabled Coachcard – Following the government's scrapping of the concessionary half-price fares for disabled people in October 2011, National Express introduced a Disabled Coachcard. Available to adults registered as disabled, this gives a third off standard and fully flexible fares.

Fleet

National Express and its franchisees operate a limited number of vehicle types with bodies made by Caetano to the company’s specification.

The primary coach type on the network is the Caetano Levante, which may have 2 or 3 axles. This has been the main vehicle of choice since 2006. The most recent Levante III was introduced onto the network in July 2018 and an updated version Levante IIIa from 2023. There is no 2 axle version of the Levante III.

The only other branded vehicles used on the network are 10 Caetano Boa Vista double deckers. 

Having withdrawn all its double deck coaches after an accident in January 2007, in October 2016 National Express placed six Caetano bodied Scania K410s into service. followed by a further 4 in 2018

On-board services
In the mid-1980s during the Rapide era, an on-board tea service and on-board televisions were in operation. These were given extensive advertising campaigns as shown on the BBC Three documentary History of the Coach.

In April 2001 National Express phased out its on-board catering service, having already phased out its on-board television service in the 1990s. However, in late 2004 National Express launched NXTV or National Xpress Television. Rather than showing a whole film as on an aircraft, NXTV would instead show various episodes of British television series such as A Touch of Frost, My Family and Top Gear, all of which were commissioned by ITV and the BBC. The service was displayed on small monitors situated above the overhead luggage compartments, powered by a motor to move downwards and upwards while the programming would be played from a DVD drive at the driver's dashboard.

The service was phased out in the summer of 2006, due to a lack of interest in purchasing headphones, available at vending machines in the major stations and also via on-board vendors before a journey. The reason for the service's failure was that the headphone jack was compatible with any headphone, removing any reason to buy those offered. Also, by the time NXTV was launched, the Apple iPod was already at its height of popularity, diverting interest away from it. Programming was also very limited, with many of the episodes being frequent repeats from terrestrial television. The headphones were later given away free when the service was about to be ceased. The advertising slogan was "Television shows as you board the coach".

National Express Coaches now offers free WiFi on most coaches.

Accidents
Since National Express started operating, incidents include:
 26 July 1974: Three killed and over 30 injured when a double-decker overturned on the M1 near Luton after swerving to avoid an earlier collision.
 17 August 1983: Three killed on the M4 motorway near Swindon when a lorry careered into the side of a coach.
 3 August 1985: One killed and 40 injured when a double-decker overturned on the A1 in County Durham after swerving to avoid a sheep on the carriageway.
 In 2007, two coaches were involved in separate fatal accidents, in January and September.
 On 4 September 2009 at Gatwick Airport, a car collided with and ended up underneath a National Express coach. The single occupant of the car was killed instantly. The coach driver was taken to hospital and treated for shock. One coach passenger suffered a minor injury.
 On 17 April 2018 a coach travelling from Manchester to Birmingham was involved in a crash on the M6 motorway near Crewe; two people on board were injured and taken to hospital.

See also
List of bus operators of the United Kingdom
Coach transport in the United Kingdom
ALSA, another bus & coach subsidiary of National Express
Royal Blue Coach Services, coach company from West country
Southdown Motor Services; coach company from Hampshire

References

External links

Airport bus services
Coach operators in England
Coach operators in Scotland
Coach operators in Wales
Former nationalised industries of the United Kingdom
National Express companies
Transport companies established in 1972
1972 establishments in the United Kingdom